is a Japanese writer from Nagoya, Aichi. He was awarded the 137th Akutagawa Prize in 2007 for Asatte no Hito (アサッテの人, "The person of the day after tomorrow"). The novel was first published in the literary magazine Gunzo, winning the magazine's award for new writers.

Work 
 Asatte no hito. Kōdansha, 2007, 
 Risun. Kōdansha, 2008, 
 Lombardia enkei. Kōdansha, 2009, 
 Ryōdo. Shinchōsha, 2011, Kurzgeschichtensammlung
 Suwa-shi monjū. Kōdansha, 2012, 
 Hen-ai zōshoshitsu. Kokushokankōkai,  2014, 
 Gan-yen no Joō. Shinchosha,  2017,

References

1969 births
Living people
Japanese writers
Akutagawa Prize winners
People from Nagoya
Academic staff of Aichi Shukutoku University